Francis Roderick Kemp AO, OBE, (Eaglehawk, 3 July 1908 - Melbourne 14 September 1987), known as Roger, was one of Australia's foremost practitioners of transcendental abstraction. Kemp developed a system of symbols and motifs which were deployed to develop a method of manifesting creativity at a fundamental level, striving in particular to explain humanities place in a universal order.

Youth 
Francis Roderick Kemp was born on 3 July 1908, in California Gully, Eaglehawk. His father, Frank Kemp, worked at a gold mine, and his mother, Rebecca Kemp, raised the family. Both the Kemps and Harveys were devout Methodists and proud Cornish people. In 1913 the family moved to Melbourne after a mining accident. In late February 1920 Roger's father was struck by a tram and was pronounced dead on arrival when Roger was 12 years old.

Work 
At twenty-one Kemp took his first formal steps to becoming an artist by taking classes in drawing at the National Gallery Art School stationed next to the National Gallery of Victoria. In 1932 Kemp enrolled into the Working Men's College, briefly studying commercial art before returning to the National Gallery Art School for classes in painting from 1933 to 1935.

Although he sold no works, Kemp's first solo exhibition at the Velasquez Gallery in Melbourne in June 1945 drew interest. He went on to win the McCaughey Prize in 1961, the Georges Invitation art prize and the Transfield Art Prize in 1965 and the Blake Prize in 1968 and 1970.

Kemp was at the forefront of abstract expressionism in Australia which saw resistance from the Antipodean movement, an art collective who asserted the importance of Australian figurative art over abstraction expression.

Personal life 
In 1943, he married Edna Merle McCrohan, an art teacher; the couple had four daughters, including Jenny, a playwright. He died in Sandringham in 1987.

Reception 
Kemp's first solo show, held at Velasquez Gallery, received varying reviews, with J. S. MacDonald, a vocal opponent of Modernism, roundly condemning it in The Age,
“Roger Kemp seems to hold that anything but representation is the role of representation. He tells one In depictive terms, or endeavours to, about things which another medium than paint could better describe. But, as one of the public, this writer would rather be told, in words, all about the Development of Rotundity In Orchestration, or have it played to him (on a hurdy-gurdy exhumed for the occasion). Static motion is another condition not so good on canvas. Titles concocted so laboriously are hard to paint up to, and Mr. Kemp just cannot make it. The vogue he has elected to follow and conform to is fading; a very realistic world is weary of it.”
while Alan McCulloch, who was to become a significant supporter of Kemp, was more favourable in the Argus;
“A fantasia of flying forms and clamorous colour at the Velasquez Gallery introduces the work of Roger Kemp. Diagonal, rather well proportioned shapes in lively pinks, greens, indigo blues, iron greys, and ochre, give a feeling of violent movement to Mr Kemp's pictures. He has a strong emotional reaction to colour and to the general confusion of current affairs, but the titles to his paintings, viz, "Subjective Objectivity," "Development of Rotundity in Orchestration," &c, have no other meaning whatsoever.”

Legacy 
Dame Elisabeth Murdoch commissioned several tapestries of some of Kemp's works. They are on permanent display at the great hall of the National Gallery of Victoria. They are exhibited alongside the stained-glass ceiling, which was created by his contemporary Leonard French, and are considered some of the most identifiable works at the NGV. A retrospective was held at the Ian Potter Centre, NGV Australia, commemorating his life and career in 2019.

References

External links
Roger Kemp
Roger Kemp auction record
Roger Kemp in National Gallery of Australia
Entry in Australian Dictionary of Biography

1908 births
1987 deaths
Australian people of Cornish descent
20th-century Australian painters
20th-century Australian male artists
Blake Prize for Religious Art winners
Australian male painters
National Gallery of Victoria Art School alumni
People from Bendigo
Artists from Victoria (Australia)